Carla Cristina Field Rondón (born August 2, 1991) is a Venezuelan TV host, model and actress who began her career at an early age after participating in the National Beauty contest Feria de la Chinita XLIII. In August 2009 she starts as a co-host in the primetime live TV show  on Televen. After 5 years, she hosted comedy prank show Tas Pilla'o, also on Televen. In 2016 she comes back co-hosting La Bomba, until August 2017. On 2018 she became image and model as Chicas Polar for Empresas Polar.

TV Hosting

References

External links 
 

1991 births
Living people